Jerry O'Neil (born March 28, 1956) is an American retired NASCAR driver from Auburn, New York. He competed in 16 NASCAR Winston Cup Series races in his career between 1990 and 1993.

His last start in Winston Cup was in 1993, at the second Charlotte event. O'Neil was also a frequent competitor in the Automobile Racing Club of America (ARCA).

Motorsports career results

NASCAR
(key) (Bold – Pole position awarded by qualifying time. Italics – Pole position earned by points standings or practice time. * – Most laps led.)

Winston Cup Series

Daytona 500

ARCA Hooters SuperCar Series
(key) (Bold – Pole position awarded by qualifying time. Italics – Pole position earned by points standings or practice time. * – Most laps led.)

References

External links
 

1956 births
Living people
ARCA Menards Series drivers
NASCAR drivers
Sportspeople from Auburn, New York
Racing drivers from New York (state)